Reynaldo Sucayan Tamayo Jr. is a Filipino politician serving as the governor of South Cotabato since 2019. He was previously mayor of Tupi from 2010 to 2019.

He has been the party president of Partido Federal ng Pilipinas (PFP) since 2019.

References

External links
Province of South Cotabato Official Website

Living people
People from South Cotabato
Partido Federal ng Pilipinas politicians
Year of birth missing (living people)